Daniel Bailey (born 1986) is a sprinter from Antigua and Barbuda.

Dan, Daniel or Danny Bailey may also refer to:

Daniel Bailey (basketball) (born 1990), American basketball player for Tokyo Excellence in Japan
Daniel A. Bailey (1894–1970), American politician in Pennsylvania
Daniel "Chipp" Bailey (born 1948), sheriff of Mecklenburg County, North Carolina
Dan Bailey (footballer) (1893–1967), English footballer
Dan Bailey (American football) (born 1988), American football placekicker
 Dan Bailey (conservationist) (1904–1982), American conservationist
 Danny Bailey (born 1964), English footballer
 "The Ballad of Danny Bailey (1909–34)", a song from Elton John album Goodbye Yellow Brick Road